The women's 67 kg competition in Taekwondo at the 2020 Summer Olympics was held on 26 July 2021, at the Makuhari Messe Hall A.

Results

Main bracket

Repechage

References

External links
Draw 

Women's 67 kg
Women's events at the 2020 Summer Olympics
2021 in women's taekwondo